The Era 2010 World Tour is the fourth live album by Taiwanese singer Jay Chou, released on 25 January 2011 by JVR Music and included a date filmed at Taipei Arena on 11 June 2010 from The Era World Tour.

Track listing
DVD
 "Opening"
 "Dragon Knight" (龍戰騎士)
 "The Era" (跨時代)
 "Snake Dance" (蛇舞) feat. Lara Veronin
 "Love Before the Century" (愛在西元前)
 "I'm Not Worthy Enough" (我不配)
 "Hip-hop Stewardess" (嘻哈空姐)
 "William Castle" (威廉古堡)
 "Magician" (魔術先生)
 "Black Humor" (黑色幽默) feat. Cindy Yen
 "If I Think of You I'll Write You a Letter" (想你就寫信) performed by The Drifters
 "You're My Bandaid" (你是我的OK繃) feat. The Drifters
 "Fragrant Rice" (稻香)
 "Sunshine Homeboy" (陽光宅男)
 "Tornado" (龍捲風)
 "Where's the Promised Happiness" (說好的幸福呢) / "Elimination" (淘汰) / "Blue and White Porcelain" (青花瓷)
 "Free Tutorial Video" (免費教學錄影帶)
 "Time Machine" (時光機)
 "Dad, I've Come Back" (爸，我回來了) / "Who Knows My Mind" (心事無人知)
 "It Rains All Night" (雨下一整夜)
 "Diary: Fly for Love" (愛的飛行日記) feat. Gary Yang
 “Superman VCR" (超人VCR)
 "In Father's Name" (以父之名)
 "Couldn't Say" (開不了口)
 "Give Me Some Time for a Song" (給我一首歌的時間) feat. Jolin Tsai
 "East Wind Breaks" (東風破)
 "Nunchucks" (雙截棍)
CD 1
 "Dragon Knight" (龍戰騎士)
 "The Era" (跨時代)
 "Snake Dance" (蛇舞) feat. Lara Veronin
 "Love Before the Century" (愛在西元前)
 "I'm Not Worthy Enough" (我不配)
 "Hip-hop Stewardess" (嘻哈空姐)
 "William Castle" (威廉古堡)
 "Magician" (魔術先生)
 "Black Humor" (黑色幽默) feat. Cindy Yen
 "If I Think of You I'll Write You a Letter" (想你就寫信) performed by The Drifters
 "You're My Bandaid" (你是我的OK繃) feat. The Drifters
 "Fragrant Rice " (稻香)
 "Sunshine Homeboy" (陽光宅男)
 "Tornado" (龍捲風)
 "Where's the Promised Happiness" (說好的幸福呢) / "Elimination" (淘汰) / "Blue and White Porcelain" (青花瓷)
CD 2
 "Free Tutorial Video" (免費教學錄影帶)
 "Time Machine" (時光機)
 "Dad, I've Come Back" (爸，我回來了) / "Who Knows My Mind" (心事無人知)
 "It Rains All Night" (雨下一整夜)
 "Diary: Fly for Love" (愛的飛行日記) feat. Gary Yang
 "In Father's Name" (以父之名)
 "I Find It Hard to Say" (開不了口)
 "East Wind Breaks" (東風破)
 "Nunchucks" (雙截棍)

References

External links
  Jay Chou discography@JVR Music

2011 live albums
Albums recorded at the Taipei Arena
Jay Chou albums
Sony Music Taiwan albums